Amphisbaena littoralis is a species of worm lizards found in Brazil.

References

littoralis
Reptiles described in 2014
Taxa named by Igor Joventino Roberto
Taxa named by Lucas B.M. Brito
Taxa named by Robson Waldemar Ávila
Endemic fauna of Brazil
Reptiles of Brazil